Encyclopædia Britannica, Inc., is a British-American company known for publishing the Encyclopædia Britannica, the world's oldest continuously published encyclopaedia, as well as extensive digital efforts—including text and audiovisual—that are aimed at educational tools for primary and secondary schools, and for everyday learners accessing information through online search.

In 2012, after 244 years, Britannica ended the print editions, with the 32 volumes of the 2010 encyclopædia being the last to be printed in the traditional hard-bound volumes. By the time the company had stopped publishing the print editions, printed sales only represented about 1% of their business. Since then, Britannica has published the encyclopedia exclusively online.

History

Founding years

The company was founded in Edinburgh, Scotland, in the 18th century, during the historical period termed the Scottish Enlightenment. Colin Macfarquhar and Andrew Bell began the first edition in 1768. The pair engaged William Smellie, who produced most of the articles in the first edition. The second edition was published in 1784. After Macfarquhar's death in 1793, Bell became its sole proprietor and published the third and fourth editions.

Archibald Constable, an Edinburgh publisher, published the fifth and sixth editions. When Constable died in 1827, A & C Black Ltd. bought the copyrights to the encyclopædia at auction, and they published it for the next 70 years.

Beginning with the ninth edition in 1875, the range of topics were expanded by bringing in contributors from the literary field, social sciences and the scientific community. The ninth edition has since been acknowledged as one of the most impressive collections of scholarship ever produced.

In 1901, Horace E. Hooper and Walter M. Jackson purchased all copyrights to the encyclopædia. Hooper and Jackson formed companies in both the United States and England. Hugh Chisholm became the editor for the tenth, eleventh and twelfth editions.

Sears Roebuck ownership

In 1915, Sears agreed to market a new and less expensive version of the eleventh edition for middle-class buyers. In 1920, Sears bought Britannica outright, and after only three years of operation, Sears reported a loss of $1.8 million. In 1923, they sold the company back to the widow of Hooper (who had died in 1922) and her brother William Cox. They published the twelfth and thirteenth editions in 1922 and 1926. After Cox failed to raise the money needed to publish the fourteenth edition, Sears ended up financing it, and resumed ownership of Britannica in 1928.

In 1932, Sears restructured Britannica, ending sales through their outlets, opting instead for a network of sales representatives who went door-to-door, and staffing booths at conventions and shopping centres. In 1938, Britannica began publishing a yearly synopsis of world events, called the Britannica Book of the Year.

Benton family ownership
In 1941, Britannica was gifted to the University of Chicago by Sears. However, the university didn't believe they could manage the company. William Benton, then vice president of the university, offered to put up the operating capital to protect the university against any losses. Benton bought two‐thirds of the stock, and subsequently bought the remaining third. In 1952, Benton started preparations for the fifteenth edition. Britannica acquired Merriam-Webster in 1964 and Compton's Encyclopedia as well in the early 1960s.

Benton died in 1973, before the fifteenth edition was published in 1974. The newly titled Britannica 3 was composed of a ten-volume Micropædia, a 19-volume Macropædia  and a one-volume guide to the encyclopædia's use, called Propædia. In 1985, a two-volume index was added, as well as other refinements. Robert P. Gwinn succeeded Benton as publisher and chairman of Britannica in 1974. He divided the company's operations into Britannica USA and Britannica International. In 1990, nearly 120,000 encyclopædias were sold in the United States, with sales for the year rising to $650 million. By 1994, sales had slumped to $453 million, with only 51,000 sets being sold in the US. Sales continued to decline after 1994, finally forcing the company to close more than 70 percent of its sales offices.

Safra ownership

In 1996, Britannica was sold to an investment group led by Jacob E. Safra, a Switzerland-based financier. He restructured the company, laying off more than 120 people including many of the company's top employees. Safra also dissolved the home sales force, with an additional 140 losing their jobs, along with 300 independent contractors. In 1999, they launched Britannica.com, which contained the complete Encyclopædia Britannica. The website repeatedly crashed on its opening day, due to an estimated ten million users attempting to access the site. After several days of continued problems it was shut down, and restarted a few weeks later with upgraded capacity. Britannica.com laid off 20 percent of its work force one year later.

In 2009, Britannica Global Edition was printed with 30 volumes. It contained over 40,000 articles and 8,500 photographs. In 2012, after 244 years, Britannica ended the print editions, with the 32 volumes of the 2010 installment being the last on paper; future editions have been published exclusively online since. In 2018, the company released Britannica Insights, an extension for the Chrome web browser. The extension supplements Google's featured snippets with accurate information. In 2019, in a partnership with Binumi, Britannica released a video product that gives schools the opportunity to use millions of royalty-free multimedia clips to create digital storytelling projects about content they are already teaching.

In 2020, Encyclopædia Britannica released the Britannica All New Children's Encyclopedia: What We Know and What We Don't, an encyclopedia aimed primarily at younger readers, covering major topics. The encyclopedia was widely praised for bringing back the print format. It was Britannica's first encyclopedia for children since 1984. ProCon.org was acquired by Encyclopædia Britannica in 2020.

See also

Encyclopædia Britannica First Edition
Encyclopædia Britannica Second Edition
Encyclopædia Britannica Third Edition
Encyclopædia Britannica Eleventh Edition
Encyclopædia Britannica Films
Encyclopædia Britannica Online
Encyclopædia Britannica Ultimate Reference Suite
Lists of encyclopedias
 List of encyclopedias by date
 List of online encyclopedias

Notes

References

Further reading

External links

Company website
Encyclopædia Britannica company history.

Encyclopædia Britannica
Book publishing companies of Scotland
1768 establishments in Scotland
Companies based in Chicago
Book publishing companies based in Illinois
Companies based in Edinburgh
History of Edinburgh
British companies established in 1768
Publishing companies established in the 1760s
Reference publishers
1996 mergers and acquisitions